Professor Mapalagama Liyanage Neville Kingsley Pierre De Silva FRCS, FRCOG (Great Britain) FCOG (SL) (October 26, 1932 in Kandana, Sri Lanka – April 3, 2006) was a Sri Lankan obstetrician and gynaecologist who served as president of the Sri Lanka College of Obstetricians & Gynaecologists in 1985–87. He was Consultant Obstetrician and Gynaecologist at the Sri Jayewardenepura General Hospital from 1984. He was also a senior lecturer at the University of Colombo, and subsequently Professor of Obstetrics and Gynaecology at the University of Peradeniya (1976–1984). 

The University of Peradeniya has subsequently awarded the "Kingsley de Silva Prize for Obstetrics & Gynaecology".

References
 St Benedict College, Colombo 12, Sri Lanka 
 Appreciation

1932 births
2006 deaths
People from Western Province, Sri Lanka
Sri Lankan obstetricians
Academic staff of the University of Colombo
Academic staff of the University of Peradeniya